The Japanese submarine I-179 (originally I-79) was a Kaidai type cruiser submarine of the KD7 sub-class built for the Imperial Japanese Navy (IJN) during the 1940s. She was lost with all hands when a valve was accidentally left open during her sea trials in July 1943. Her wreck was later salvaged and scrapped in 1957.

Design and description
The submarines of the KD7 sub-class were medium-range attack submarines developed from the preceding KD6 sub-class. They displaced  surfaced and  submerged.

For surface running, the boats were powered by two  diesel engines, each driving one propeller shaft. When submerged each propeller was driven by a  electric motor. They could reach  on the surface and  underwater.

The boats were armed with six internal  torpedo tubes, all in the bow. They carried one reload for each tube; a total of a dozen torpedoes. They were originally intended to be armed with two twin-gun mounts for the  Type 96 anti-aircraft gun, but a  deck gun for combat on the surface was substituted for one 25 mm mount during construction.

Construction and career
Built by the Kawasaki Dockyard Co. at their shipyard in Kobe, I-179 was laid down on 21 August 1941 under the name of Submarine No. 157 and renamed I-179 on 1 November 1941. The boat was launched on 16 July 1942 and completed on 18 June 1943. While conducting her sea trials in the Inland Sea on 14 July, she sank with the loss of all 85 officers and crewmen. I-179 was struck from the Navy List on 15 April 1944. Her wreck was salvaged from April 1956 to 1 March 1957 and scrapped at Kure.

Notes

References
 
 
 
 
 

1942 ships
Ships built by Kawasaki Heavy Industries
Kaidai-class submarines
World War II submarines of Japan
Maritime incidents in July 1943
Ships lost with all hands
Japanese submarines lost during World War II
Japanese submarine accidents